Mount Boundinga is a sandstone rock lying south of Moanda, a manganese mining town in Gabon. It is larger than its neighbour, Mount Moanda, but lower in height. The road connecting Moanda to Bakoumba passes between the two rocks.

The rock is respected by Moanda residents and is considered almost holy by the residents of the Third Zone district of the city. Several stories and legends about the rock exist.

Hotel Boundinga, the largest hotel in Moanda, is named after the mountain.

Mountains of Gabon